An open redirect is a type of computer security vulnerability found in web applications.

Attack 
An application can be exploited if it parses user input for making an URL redirection decision, which is then not properly validated.

References

External links 
  Open redirection (reflected) by PortSwigger

Web security exploits
Injection exploits
Hacking (computer security)